Margaret Jones (March 1842 – October 18, 1902) was a 19th-century Welsh travel writer whose work was published under the pseudonym Y Gymraes o Ganaan.

Biography 
Margaret Jones was born in 1842 in Rhosllannerchrugog, Denbighshire, Wales.

As a child, she only received three weeks of schooling. She then left for Birmingham, where she worked as a maid for a Jewish family that had been converted to Christianity. It was in this role that she began traveling the world, spending two years in Paris and four in Jerusalem with the family as they performed missionary work in the Jewish communities there.

Jones became well known in Wales for writing accounts of her international travels, notably in Palestine and Morocco. Over the course of her travels, she visited five continents: Europe, Asia, Africa, North America, and Oceania. She wrote in Welsh under the pseudonym Y Gymraes o Ganaan, meaning "The Welsh Lady from Canaan."

In 1869, she published Llythyrau Cymraes o Wlad Canaan, a collection of letters home from her travels in Palestine. Her subsequent memoir of her travel to Morocco, Morocco a'r hyn a welais yno, was published in 1883.

After further travels in the United States, Jones eventually settled in Australia, where she married a wealthy farmer named James Josey, who had been exiled there from England. She lived there until her death, in Redbank Plains, Queensland, in 1902.

Further reading 

 Jones, Eirian (2012).The Welsh Lady from Canaan. Y Lolfa Cyf.

References 

1842 births
1902 deaths
19th-century Welsh writers
19th-century Welsh women writers
20th-century Welsh people
20th-century Welsh women
People from Rhosllanerchrugog
Welsh travel writers
British women travel writers
Welsh emigrants to Australia
Pseudonymous women writers
Maids
Welsh domestic workers
Welsh expatriates in France
Expatriates in Ottoman Palestine
Welsh-language writers
Welsh memoirists
British women memoirists
People from Queensland
Writers on the Middle East
19th-century pseudonymous writers